There have been two baronetcies created for members of the Orr-Ewing family, both in the Baronetage of the United Kingdom. Both creations are extant as of 2010.

History
The Orr Ewing Baronetcy, of Ballikinrain in the parish of Killearn in the County of Stirling and of Lennoxbank in the parish of Bonhill in the County of Dunbarton, was created in the Baronetage of the United Kingdom on 8 March 1886 for the Conservative politician Archibald Orr-Ewing. He was the seventh son of William Ewing, a merchant of Glasgow, and Susan, daughter of John Orr, Provost of Paisley. The fourth Baronet was a Brigadier-General in the British Army. Charles Lindsay Orr-Ewing, fifth son of the first Baronet, was Member of Parliament for Ayr Burghs. His son Sir Ian Leslie Orr-Ewing was Member of Parliament for Weston-super-Mare.

The Orr-Ewing Baronetcy, of Hendon in the County of Middlesex, was created on 27 June 1963 for the Conservative politician Ian Orr-Ewing. He was the grandson of John Orr-Ewing, fourth son of the first Baronet. In 1970 he was created a life peer as Baron Orr-Ewing, of Little Berkhamsted in the County of Hertford. The life peerage became extinct on his death in 1999 while he was succeeded in the baronetcy by his son, the second Baronet.

Orr-Ewing baronets, of Ballikinrain and Lennoxbank (1886)
Sir Archibald Orr-Ewing, 1st Baronet (1818–1893)
Sir William Orr Ewing, 2nd Baronet (1848–1903)
Sir Archibald Ernest Orr Ewing, 3rd Baronet (1853–1919)
Sir Norman Archibald Orr-Ewing, 4th Baronet (23 November 1880 – 26 March 1960). Orr-Ewing was a Brigadier-General in the Army and served as Grand Master of the Grand Lodge of Scotland from 1937 to 1939. He married Laura Louisa Robarts, a granddaughter of Percy Barrington, 8th Viscount Barrington, on 24 July 1911. He died in March 1960, and was succeeded in the baronetcy by his son Ronald.
Sir Ronald Archibald Orr-Ewing, 5th Baronet (14 May 1912 – 14 September 2002). Orr-Ewing succeeded his father in 1960. He was Grand Master of the Grand Lodge of Scotland between 1965 and 1969. He married Marion Hester Cameron on 6 April 1938. They had four children: Sir Archibald Donald Orr-Ewing, 6th Baronet (b. 20 December 1938); Janet Elizabeth Orr-Ewing (b. 9 November 1940); Fiona Marion Orr-Ewing (b. 3 March 1946); Ronald James Orr-Ewing (b. 9 January 1948). Orr-Ewing died in September 2002, aged 90, and was succeeded in the baronetcy by his eldest son Archibald (see below).
Sir Archibald Donald Orr-Ewing, 6th Baronet (born 20 December 1938). Orr-Ewing is the eldest son of Sir Ronald Archibald Orr-Ewing, 5th Baronet and was educated at Gordonstoun and Trinity College Dublin. He was the Grand Master Mason of The Grand Lodge of Ancient, Free and Accepted Masons of Scotland, until 27 November 2008 a post he held since 2005. He previously held the post between 1999 and 2004, being the only person to hold that office twice. He was installed as Deputy Grand Master & Governor (the administrator) of the Royal Order of Scotland at Edinburgh on 3 July 2009. He is the current Lieutenant Grand Commander of the Supreme Council for Scotland of the Ancient and Accepted Scottish Rite, having succeeded to the Council in 1998. He married firstly Venetia Turner on 10 December 1965. They divorced in 1972 and Orr-Ewing then married as his second wife Nicola Black, a great-granddaughter of James Innes-Ker, 7th Duke of Roxburghe. They have one son, Alastair.

The heir apparent is the present holder's son Alastair Frederick Archibald Orr-Ewing (born 1982).

Orr-Ewing baronets, of Hendon (1963)
Sir (Charles) Ian Orr-Ewing, 1st Baronet (1912–1999) (created Baron Orr-Ewing in 1971)
Sir (Alistair) Simon Orr-Ewing, 2nd Baronet (born 1940)

The heir apparent is the present holder's son Archie Cameron Orr-Ewing (born 1969). The next sons in line are Alfie, Ronnie and George Orr-Ewing.

Notes

References
Kidd, Charles, Williamson, David (editors). Debrett's Peerage and Baronetage (1990 edition). New York: St Martin's Press, 1990, 

Burke's Peerage
Who's Who 2009

Baronetcies in the Baronetage of the United Kingdom